Ustad Shafiq-Uz-Zaman Khan (Urdu استاد شفیق الزماں خان a famous Pakistani calligrapher and head of restoring art at Masjid an-Nabawi the second holiest site of Muslims in the world. He is famous for Arabic calligraphy Khat-e-Sulas Thuluth. He was born in Rawalpindi 2 November 1956 and grew up in Karachi Pakistan.
He is inspired by famous Turkish calligrapher Hamid Aytaç.

Awards
first prize in the First International Arabic Calligraphy Competition 2012
Shafiq-Uz-Zaman Khan won first prize in the First International Arabic Calligraphy Competition organized in Makkah.
Presidential Pride of Performance تمغائے حسن کارکردگی in Pakistan in 2014.

References

Calligraphers of Arabic script
Pakistani calligraphers
20th-century Pakistani painters
Artists from Karachi
Muslim artists
Recipients of the Pride of Performance
Recipients of Sitara-i-Imtiaz
Recipients of Nishan-e-Imtiaz
Living people
1956 births